Aubrey is traditionally a male English given name. The name is from the French derivation Aubry of the Germanic given name Alberic / Old High German given name Alberich, which consists of the elements ALF "elf" and RIK "king", from Proto-Germanic *albiz "elf", "supernatural being" and *rīkaz "chieftain", "ruler". Before the Norman conquest, the Anglo-Saxons used the corresponding variant Ælf-rīc (see Ælfric).

The feminine form Aubrey is sometimes from Old French Aubree with a different etymology: Albereda, sometimes a feminine used of the masculine name Aubrey. However, Aubrey is commonly used as a feminine name in the United States. It was the 15th most popular girl's name in the United States in 2012.

People

Surname 
 Andrew Aubrey, Lord Mayor of London in 1339, 1340, and 1351
 Anne Aubrey (born 1935), English actress
 Brandon Aubrey (born 1995), American soccer player
 Chris Aubrey (born 1991), English darts player
 Emlyn Aubrey (born 1964), US professional golfer

 Various persons named James Aubrey
 Various persons named John Aubrey
 Juliet Aubrey (born 1966), English actress
 Matthew Aubrey (born 1997), Welsh rugby union player
 Michael Aubrey (born 1982), American baseball player
 Sam Aubrey (1922–2008), former basketball player and coach of Oklahoma State University
 Sarah Aubrey, Australian actress
 Stuart Aubrey (born 1990), Australian politician
 William Aubrey (died 1595), Welsh lawyer, judge and MP
 William Aubrey (engineer) (1759–1827), Welsh engineer

Given name

Pre-nineteenth century 
 Aubrey (archbishop of Reims), Archbishop of Reims from 1207 to 1218
 Aubrey de Coucy, Earl of Northumbria from 1080 to about 1086
 Aubrey de Troisfontaines (died c. 1250), French chronicler of the 13th century
 Aubrey de Vere I (died c. 1110), 11th-century Anglo-Norman knight
 Aubrey de Vere II (c. 1080–1141), 12th-century Lord Great Chamberlain of England
 Aubrey de Vere III (c. 1115–94), first Earl of Oxford
 Aubrey de Vere IV (c. 1170–1214), second Earl of Oxford
 Aubrey de Vere, 10th Earl of Oxford (c. 1338–1400)
 Aubrey de Vere, 20th Earl of Oxford (1627–1703), Royalist during the Civil War
 Aubrey of Buonalbergo (c. 1030–1122), first wife of Robert Guiscard

Nineteenth century 
 Aubrey Beardsley (1872–1898), English artist, illustrator, and author
 Aubrey Beauclerk, 5th Duke of St Albans (1740–1802), British landowner
 Aubrey Beauclerk, 6th Duke of St Albans (1765–1815), English aristocrat and politician
 Aubrey de Vere Hunt (1761–1818), Irish politician, landowner and businessman
 Sir Aubrey de Vere, 2nd Baronet (1788–1846), Irish baronet
 Aubrey Spencer (1795–1872), English Anglican bishop
 Aubrey Thomas de Vere (1814–1902), Irish poet

Modern era 
 Aubrey Abbott (1886–1975), Australian politician
 Aubrey Aitken (1911–1985), English Anglican bishop
 Aubrey Anderson-Emmons (born 2007), American actress
 Aubrey Ankrum (born 1972), American screenwriter, animator and actor
 Aubrey Baartman (born 1958), South African politician
 Aubrey Beavers (born 1971), American football player
 Aubrey Begg (1929–1988), New Zealand politician
 A. Aubrey Bodine (1906–1970), American photographer
 Aubrey Boomer (1897–1989), Jersey golfer
 Aubrey Brain (1893–1955), British horn player and teacher
 Aubrey Burl (1926–2020), British archaeologist
 Aubrey Buxton, Baron Buxton of Alsa (1918–2009), British soldier and television executive
 Aubrey Casewell (1909–1974), Welsh rugby league footballer
 Aubrey "Dit" Clapper (1907–1978), Canadian hockey player
 Aubrey Coleman (born 1987), American basketball player
 Aubrey Cottle, Canadian hacker
 Aubrey Coverley (1895–1953), Australian politician
 Aubrey David (born 1990), Guyanese-Trinidadian international footballer
 Aubrey Dawkins (born 1995), American basketball player
 Aubrey Dexter (1898–1958), British actor
 Aubrey Devine (1897–1981), American football player
 Aubrey W. Dirlam (1913–1995), American politician
 Aubrey Dollar (born 1980), American actress
 Aubrey Solomon Meir Eban (1915–2002), the birth name of Israeli diplomat Abba Eban
 Aubrey Edwards (born 1987), American video game developer and wrestling referee
 Aubrey Faulkner (1881–1930), South African cricketer
 Aubrey Fitch (1883–1978), American admiral
 Aubrey David (born 1990), Guyanese footballer
 Aubrey de Grey (born 1963), English gerontologist
 Aubrey de Sélincourt (1894–1962), English classicist
 Aubrey Dunn Jr., American politician
 Aubrey Ellwood (1897–1992), British Royal Air Force commander
 Aubrey Fitzgerald (1874–1968), British actor
 Aubrey Fowler (1920–1996), American football player
 Aubrey Drake Graham (born 1986), the birth name of Canadian musician, actor, and entrepreneur Drake
 Aubrey Givens (1912–1983), American football and basketball coach
 G. Aubrey Goodman (1862–1921), Barbadian barrister and politician
 Aubrey Haynie (born 1974), American bluegrass musician
 Aubrey Herbert (1880–1923), British colonel and diplomat
 Aubrey Hodges (born 1966), American musician
 Aubrey Huff (born 1976), American baseball player
 Aubrey Kelly, American football coach
 Aubrey Koch (1904–1975), Australian pilot
 Aubrey Kingsbury (born 1991), American soccer player
 Aubrey "Aub" Lawson (1914–1977), Australian speedway rider
 Aubrey Layne (born 1956), American government official
 Aubrey Lewis (1900–1975), Australian psychiatrist
 Aubrey Lyles (1883–1932), African-American performer and lyricist with FE Miller as "Miller and Lyles"
 Aubrey Jones (1911–2003), British politician
 Aubrey Joseph (born 1997), American rapper and actor
 Aubrey Luck (1900–1999), Australian politician
 Aubrey Lyles (1884–1932), American vaudeville performer
 Aubrey Mallalieu (1873–1948), English actor
 Aubrey Manning (1930–2018), English zoologist and broadcaster
 Aubrey Mather (1885–1958), English actor
 Aubrey McClendon (1959–2016) American businessman, oil and natural gas pioneer
 Aubrey McDade (born 1981), United States Marine
 Aubrey McDonald (born 1988), South African rugby union player
 Aubrey Matthews (born 1962), American football player
 Aubrey Miles (born 1980), Filipina actress
 Aubrey Morris (1926–2015), English actor
 Aubrey Modiba (born 1995), South African soccer player
 Aubrey Nealon (born 1971), Canadian film and television director, producer and writer
 Aubrey Newman (1904–1994), American general
 Aubrey Newman (historian) (born 1927) British historian
 Aubrey Ngoma (born 1989), South African footballer
 Aubrey Nunn (born 1966), British bass guitarist, member of Faithless
 Aubrey J. O'Brien (1870–1930), British soldier and writer on India
 Aubrey O'Day (born 1984), American singer
 Aubrey Peeples (born 1993), American actress and singer
 Aubrey Plaza (born 1984), American actress
 Aubrey Pleasant, American football coach
 Aubrey Powell (disambiguation), several people
 Aubrey Reese (born 1978), American basketball player
 Aubrey Richards (1920–2000), Welsh actor
 Aubrey Robinson (disambiguation), several people
 Aubrey Schenck (1908–1999), American film producer
 Aubrey Scotto (1895–1953), American film director
 Aubrey Sherrod (born 1962), American basketball player
 Aubrey Simons (1921–2014), English table tennis player
 Aubrey Smith (disambiguation), several people
 Aubrey Strahan (1852–1928), British geologist
 Aubrey Suwito, Malaysian musician
 Aubrey Swanepoel (born 1989), South African cricketer
 W. Aubrey Thomas (1866–1951), American scientist and politician
 Aubrey Willard (1894–1961), Australian tennis player
 Aubrey Williams (disambiguation), several people
 Aubrey Wisberg (1909–1990), British–American filmmaker
 Aubrey Woods (1928–2013), British actor

Fictional characters 
 Jack Aubrey, one of the protagonists from Patrick O'Brian's Aubrey–Maturin series
 Aubrey Valentine, in the popular BBC soap opera EastEnders
 Aubrey, the principal character of the 1980 eponymous ITV cartoon series Aubrey
 Aubrey, a main vampire in the novel Demon in My View by Amelia Atwater-Rhodes
 Aubrey James, the antagonist of Stroker Ace, a 1983 action comedy film
 Aubrey, the narrator and main character of The Vampyre by John Polidori
 Aubrey Posen, one of the main characters in the 2012 film Pitch Perfect
 Aubrey Aubergine, one of the Munch Bunch
 Aubrey Flemming, protagonist of the 2007 psychological thriller "I Know Who Killed Me", portrayed by Lindsey Lohan
 Aubrey deLint, a character from David Foster Wallace's Infinite Jest
 Aubrey Little, a character played by Travis McElroy in The Adventure Zone
 Aubrey, a song written by David Gates and originally released on the 1972 Bread album Guitar Man
 Aubrey Boyce, one of Del Boy's friends in the BBC sitcom, Only Fools and Horses
 Aubrey, a character in the 2020 psychological horror role-playing video game OMORI

See also 
 Alberic (name)
 Audrey (name)
 Aubry (name)

Notes 

English feminine given names
English given names
English unisex given names
Feminine given names